Abell 2667 is a galaxy cluster. It is one of the most luminous galaxy clusters in the X-ray waveband known at a redshift about 0.2.

This cluster is also a well-known gravitational lens.

On 2 March 2007, a team of astronomers reported the detection of the Comet Galaxy in this cluster. 
 This galaxy is being ripped apart by the cluster's gravitational field and harsh environment. The finding sheds light on the mysterious process by which gas-rich spiral-shaped galaxies might evolve into gas-poor irregular- or elliptical-shaped galaxies over billions of years.

See also
 Abell catalogue
 List of Abell clusters
 X-ray astronomy

References

External links 
 Hubble Space Telescope
 Spitzer Space Telescope
 
 ESA news

2667
Galaxy clusters
Gravitational lensing
Abell richness class 3
Sculptor (constellation)